Katrin Norling (born 4 April 1979 in Ödeshög, Sweden) is a Swedish Olympic eventing rider. Representing Sweden, she competed at the 2008 Summer Olympics where she placed 4th in team and 18th in the individual eventing.

Norling also participated at two World Equestrian Games (in 2002 and 2010) and at four European Eventing Championships (in 2005, 2007, 2009 and 2011). She finished 4th in team competition at the 2009 Europeans.

References

Swedish female equestrians
1979 births
Olympic equestrians of Sweden
Equestrians at the 2008 Summer Olympics
Living people
People from Ödeshög Municipality
Sportspeople from Östergötland County